Humnasheen - Ghazals by Shreya Ghoshal is the first ghazal album of singer Shreya Ghoshal. Shreya has spent the two years working on this album and has described it as "A heartfelt humble effort from me to revive pure form. of ghazals." The music to this album has been composed by Deepak Pandit, with lyrics from Manoj Muntashir.

Development
Shreya Ghoshal is a fan of ghazals, but she had never thought to take it as a first step into the non-film world.
Urdu poetry has its own charm and impact. Ghoshal cannot do raag-based singing in films, and does not expect that it will happen in films.
"Diction needs to be very clear", she said. Her tilt towards Urdu happened only after she entered the film industry. There are so many talented lyricists and composers from whom she learnt something every day. She has learnt music from Kalyanji (composer), who told her how important diction is. When she heard old songs of Lata Mangeshkar and Mohammed Rafi, she could see how particular they were to ensure that the words were clear and beautifully pronounced.  So she teamed up with Deepak Pandit & Manoj Muntashir for the album.

Launch
The album was launched on 12 March 2014 i.e. on the occasion of Ghoshal's 30th birthday.

Track listing

Reviews
The album received an allover positive reviews from critics and listeners. BollySpice said, "Shreya, Deepak and Manoj have gifted us with an album that should be treasured in the years to come."
Mouthshut rated it 3.9/5.0

Accolades

References

2014 albums
Ghazal albums
Shreya Ghoshal albums